A GPS watch is a device with integrated GPS receiver that is worn as a single unit strapped onto a wrist, in the manner of a bracelet. The watch can have other features and capabilities depending on its intended purpose and be a smartwatch. GPS watches are most often used for sports and fitness purposes. Many can connect to external sensors by the wireless ANT+ protocol, and/or to a computer by USB to transfer data and configuration. Common sensors used are heart rate monitors and footpods (running cadence and speed sensor). A footpod can be used to supplement or replace GPS data, such as providing treadmill speed and distance for the watch to log and share. Recharging by USB is commonplace.

Optional features 
 Display (Illuminated or passive)
 Time display
 Speed/pace display
 Map display
 Routes
 Route tracking
 Heart rate monitor compatibility
 Running cadence and speed sensor (footpod) compatibility
 Cycling cadence sensor compatibility
 Cycling power meter compatibility
 Weight scale compatibility
 Compatibility with sport transitions (such as triathlons)
 Training programs (such as intervals)
 Computer connection for logging, mapping and sharing data
 Hydration/nutrition reminders
 Reminder alarms to alternate between running and walking
 Accelerometer for tracking indoor swimming
 Touchscreen
 Larger add-on rechargeable battery for longer events (marathon, etc.)

Purpose 
A GPS watch is commonly a sport watch (a device used for sports and exercise in general rather than just GPS functionally). It may be designed for one particular sport or other purpose, or provide modes and features to suit several.

Examples of common purposes:

 Data logging
 Navigation
 Fitness training (Many watches can be used for many sports such as running, walking, hiking, cycling or swimming)
 Specific sport assistance (such as golf)
 Locating children and adults with intellectual disabilities that are at risk of wandering or elopement.

History

GPS Watches for Kids 
PS watches for kids are an innovative solution for modern parents who want to keep their children safe and connected. These smart devices allow parents to track their child’s location and monitor their activities remotely. Whether a school trip or just a day at the park, GPS watches give parents peace of mind knowing their children are safe and within reach.

Here's a list of best GPS Watches for Kids by Alphaa Blogger:

 TickTalk 4
 XPLORA X5 Play
 Angel Watch
 Cosmo JrTrack 2TM Kids
 Laxcido GPS Watches For Kids
 Blackview Kids’ GPS Smartwatch
 Apple Watch SE

List of All GPS Watches

 Adidas Micoach Smart Run
 Amazfit Bip
 Amazfit Bip S
 Amazfit Bip U Pro
 Amazfit T-Rex
 Amazfit T-Rex Pro
 Apple Watch Series 2
 Apple Watch Series 3
 Apple Watch Series 4
 Bia Sport
 Casio G-Shock Rangeman GPR-B1000
 Casio G-Shock G-Squad GBD-H1000
 Casio Pathfinder
 Coros Pace 2
 Coros Apex
 Coros Apex Pro
 Garmin Approach S1 (golfing watch)
 Garmin Approach S2 (golfing watch)
 Garmin Approach S3 (golfing watch)
 Garmin Approach S4 (golfing watch)
 Garmin Approach S5 (golfing watch)
 Garmin Approach S6 (golfing watch)
 Garmin Approach S20 (golfing watch)
 Garmin Approach X40 (golfing watch)
 Garmin D2 Delta PX
 Garmin D2 Delta S
 Garmin D2 Delta
 Garmin epix (map display watch)
 Garmin fēnix
 Garmin fēnix 2
 Garmin fēnix 3
 Garmin fēnix 5
 Garmin fēnix 5 Plus
 Garmin fēnix 6
 Garmin Foretrex 101
 Garmin Foretrex 201
 Garmin Foretrex 301
 Garmin Foretrex 401
 Garmin Foretrex 601
 Garmin Foretrex 701 Ballistic Edition
 Garmin Forerunner 10
 Garmin Forerunner 15
 Garmin Forerunner 50
 Garmin Forerunner 101
 Garmin Forerunner 110
 Garmin Forerunner 201
 Garmin Forerunner 205
 Garmin Forerunner 210
 Garmin Forerunner 220
 Garmin Forerunner 225
 Garmin Forerunner 230
 Garmin Forerunner 235
 Garmin Forerunner 245
 Garmin Forerunner 245 Music
 Garmin Forerunner 301
 Garmin Forerunner 305
 Garmin Forerunner 310XT
 Garmin Forerunner 405
 Garmin Forerunner 405CX
 Garmin Forerunner 410
 Garmin Forerunner 610
 Garmin Forerunner 620
 Garmin Forerunner 630
 Garmin Forerunner 735XT
 Garmin Forerunner 910XT
 Garmin Forerunner 920XT
 Garmin Forerunner 935
 Garmin Tactix
 Garmin Quatix
 Garmin Vivoactive
 GlobalSat GH-625
 GolfBuddy WT3
 GolfBuddy WT4
 GolfBuddy WT5
 I-gotU GT-900
 Magellan Switch/Switch Up
 Motorola MOTOACTV
 MyTach
 Navig8r S10 hiking & sports
 New Balance GPS Runner
 New Balance GPS Trainer
 New Balance N9 GPS Trainer
 New Balance NX950
 New Balance NX980
 New Balance NX990
 Nike+ SportWatch GPS
 PAPAGO GoWatch770
 Polar FT60
 Polar FT80
 Polar M400
 Polar RC3
 Polar RCX3
 Polar RCX5
 Polar RS300X
 Polar RS800CX
 Polar RC3 GPS
 Polar V800
 Pyle  PSGP410  
 Pyxis RGPS-3000
 Runtastic GPS & Heart Rate Watch
 Samsung Gear S3 - SM-R770
 Samsung Gear S3 Frontier - SM-R765
 Samsung Gear S3 Frontier LTE - RM-R760
 Seiko Astron
 Soleus GPS 1.0
 Soleus GPS 2.0
 Soleus GPS 3.0
 Suunto Ambit
 Suunto Ambit 2
 Suunto Ambit 3
 Suunto G6
 Suunto G9
 Suunto X9
 Suunto X10
 Timex Ironman Easy Trainer
 Timex Ironman ONE GPS+
 Timex Ironman Run Trainer
 Timex Ironman Run Trainer 2.0
 Timex Ironman Run x20 GPS
 Timex Ironman Global Trainer
 Timex Ironman Triathlon GPS
 Timex Marathon GPS
 TomTom Golfer
 TomTom Golfer Premium Edition
 TomTom Golfer 2
 TomTom Runner
 TomTom Runner Cardio
 TomTom Multi-Sport
 TomTom Multi-Sport Cardio
 Ultega NavRun 2K11/Pyle Sports PSWGP405BL/The Sharper Image GPS XT
 Fitbit Blaze 
 Fitbit flex
 Fitbit Charge

Accelerometer-only
These devices offer similar functions to GPS watches,
but measure speed and distance using a motion sensor (built-in, or a footpod attached to a shoe), instead of GPS.
Since they do not rely on GPS, they can work indoors, but do not track location data for mapping. Certain models include heart rate monitoring, either built-in or through a chest-worn sensor. There are also a wide variety of watches that measure only heart rate and time.
 Garmin Forerunner FR60
 Garmin Forerunner FR70
 Garmin Swim
 New Balance N8 Trainer
 Nike+iPod
 Polar s625x
 Polar s725x
 Suunto Quest

See also
 Activity tracker
 Bluetooth
 GPS navigation device
 GPS tracking unit
 Heart rate monitor
 Inertial footpod
 Nike+ FuelBand
 Pedometer
 Quantified Self
 Smart band
 Smartwatch

References 

Geographical technology
Global Positioning System
Hiking equipment
Navigational equipment
Wireless locating
Wearable computers